This is a list of football clubs located in Laos, sorted by alphabetically.

 Vientiane F.C.
 EZRA F.C
 Ministry of Public Security
 Lao-American College F.C.
 Army F.C.
 Ministry of Public Works and Transport F.C.

Laos
 
Football clubs
Football clubs